Dato' Mohamad Ariff Sabri bin Abdul Aziz (Jawi: محمد عارف صبري بن عبد العزيز), commonly known by his blogger name of Sakmongkol AK47, is a Malaysian politician and prominent blogger. He is a member of Democratic Action Party (DAP), a component of Pakatan Harapan (PH) coalition. He was the Member of Parliament of Raub in Pahang for one term from 2013 to 2018.

Ariff Sabri was a member of United Malay National Organization (UMNO) until 2012 and served as the Pekan UMNO chief of information under Dato' Seri Najib Razak from 2000 to 2004 formerly. He was also the former Pahang assemblyman for Pulau Manis from 2004 to 2008 then.

In early 2012, he and another prominent blogger, Aspan Alias left UMNO and joined the DAP, citing UMNO's failure to eradicate corruption and increase the livelihood of Malays in general. He won the Pahang parliamentary seat of Raub under the DAP ticket in the 2013 general election.

He suffered a stroke in 2018 and did not seek a second term reelection for his Raub parliamentary seat in the 2018 general election.

Personal life 
Ariff Sabri graduated with a degree on economics from the University of Malaya and University of Manchester (Owens).

Election results

Honours
  :
  Knight Companion of the Order of the Crown of Pahang (DIMP) - Dato' (2008)

References

External links 
 Sakmongkol AK47

Living people
People from Pahang
Malaysian people of Malay descent
Malaysian Muslims
Malaysian bloggers
Former United Malays National Organisation politicians
Democratic Action Party (Malaysia) politicians
Members of the Dewan Rakyat
Members of the Pahang State Legislative Assembly
University of Malaya alumni
Alumni of the Victoria University of Manchester
1956 births